Thomas Arlin Gollott (born September 29, 1935) is a businessman and former state legislator in Mississippi. A Democrat, he served as a member of the Mississippi House of Representatives and Mississippi Senate before becoming a Republican in 2007. He represented the 50th District from 1980 to 2020. He had served continuously in the Mississippi Legislature from 1968, when he sat as a state representative, which he served until his election as state senator in 1979. He had been a Democrat until 2007, when he switched his affiliation to Republican. In September 2017, he became the longest-serving member of the Mississippi Legislature in history. He retired from the Senate in 2020, after deciding not to run for another term.

References

External links
Project Vote Smart - Senator Tommy Gollott's (MS) profile

Mississippi state senators
Living people
Mississippi Democrats
University of Southern Mississippi alumni
Mississippi Republicans
1935 births
21st-century American politicians